Bodden Town which is the former capital of the Cayman Islands and the largest district in the territory. It is situated on a natural harbour and a coral reef. The first settlement was named after a government leader, William Bodden. Once ravaged by pirates, this village is known for its remains of a  wall and cannon. Bodden Town has a population of 14,845 (2021 census). Its top attractions include the Mission House, which features the lifestyle of early Caymanian settlers. Bodden Town is also considered the fastest growing district in the islands in terms of resident population.

Education
The Cayman Islands Education Department operates Bodden Town Primary School and Savannah Primary School as well as the International College of the Cayman Islands, a non-profit institution of higher learning accredited by the Accrediting Council for Independent Colleges and Schools to offer associate, bachelor's and master's degrees.

Politics
The politics of Bodden Town are dominated by the moderate PACT Government coalition, who have a ‘Caymanian first’ and limited immigration stance. The Premier of the Cayman Islands, Wayne Panton’s constituency, Newlands, is located in Bodden Town (district).

Sports
Spectator sports available in Bodden Town include the Bodden Town FC.

References

External links
 National Trust for the Cayman Islands – Bodden Town, retrieved June 4,2008 

Populated places in the Cayman Islands
Grand Cayman